Buderim is an electoral district of the Legislative Assembly in the Australian state of Queensland. Based on the Sunshine Coast, the district is a very safe seat for the Liberal National Party.

Geography
A compact urban electorate, Buderim falls between the centres of Maroochydore and Nambour, bounded by the Bruce Highway to the west, and the Sunshine Motorway to the east. It includes the Sunshine Coast suburbs of Buderim, Mountain Creek, Sippy Downs and Tanawha.

History
A new district created for the 2009 state election, it was constructed mostly from the northern part of the district of Kawana and the western part of the district of Maroochydore. It also took a section of territory previously belonging to the district of Nicklin. Its inaugural member was Steve Dickson, previously the member for Kawana.

Members for Buderim

Election results

References

External links
 ABC Profile: 2009 Election

Buderim
Buderim